H. W. Lawton may refer to:

Harold Lawton (1899–2005), British scholar
Henry Ware Lawton (1843–1899), American Army officer